La La's Full Court Wedding is an American reality documentary television series on VH1. The series debuted on September 19, 2010.

A spin-off of the series, La La's Full Court Life, it follows the couple's married life.

Premise
The series documents former MTV correspondent and television personality La La Vasquez and NBA star Carmelo Anthony as they prepare for their wedding.

Episodes

References

2010s American documentary television series
2010 American television series debuts
2010 American television series endings
English-language television shows
VH1 original programming
Documentaries about weddings
Television series by 51 Minds Entertainment